Aftermath: On Marriage and Separation is a 2012 divorce memoir by Rachel Cusk dealing with her marriage and divorce from her husband Adrian Clarke.  It follows two earlier memoirs, one related to their children: A Life's Work: On Becoming a Mother.

Summary
Cusk explores her first marriage, separation and divorce.

Reception
The book was reviewed by various newspapers, including the Telegraph and The New York Times.  The Telegraph gave the memoir five stars, calling it "a beautifully wrought account of marital breakdown".

Camilla Long's review in The Sunday Times was scathing. It won the Hatchet Job of the Year award in 2013.

References

2012 non-fiction books
Canadian memoirs
British memoirs
Works about divorce
Books by Rachel Cusk
Faber and Faber books